Quşçular or Qushchular or Gushchular or Kushchular may refer to:

 Quşçular, Goranboy, Azerbaijan
 Quşçular, Jabrayil, Azerbaijan
 Quşçular, Khojavend, Azerbaijan
 Aşağı Quşçular, Shusha, Azerbaijan
 Yuxarı Quşçular, Shusha, Azerbaijan
 Quşçular, Lachin, Azerbaijan

See also
 Quşçu (disambiguation)